Aaron Davies (born 20 December 1990), better known by his stage name Bugzy Malone, is a British rapper and actor from Manchester, England. Malone has been described as one of the key artists instigating a "grime revival" moving the UK urban scene away from more commercially oriented music, and the first artist in the grime genre from Manchester to commercially succeed in the UK.

Malone's album King of the North was released on 14 July 2017 and peaked at  4 on the UK Albums Chart.

Early life 
Malone was born Aaron Davies in Withington Community Hospital and grew up in Crumpsall, Manchester, in a family of career criminals. He grew up in a poverty-stricken household and had never met his biological father in his childhood. Davies saw his stepfather as a role model until his parents divorced due to domestic abuse. He grew up being influenced by his family members who were involved in criminal activities, including his uncle whose murder he witnessed. Davies began taking part in criminal activities when he was eleven years old, and as a result was expelled from secondary school in year nine when he was fourteen. He continued a life of criminal behaviour until he was arrested when he was sixteen years old and sent to HMP Stoke Heath; he was unable to complete his GCSE exams. After leaving prison when he was 17 years old, Davies took up boxing as a hobby in an attempt to find a career and avoid returning to crime. While he was boxing as a career, Davies moved close to his biological father in Marple, Greater Manchester, before they eventually lost contact. He moved close to Heaton Park when he was 20 years old.

Davies was inspired to start rapping from the influential "Risky Roadz" DVD series that also inspired the careers of Dizzee Rascal, Wiley and Skepta. He began rapping with his friends when they would often congregate or commit crimes. His friends would play instrumentals from their mobile phones which Davies would then freestyle on. Davies received the nickname "Bugz" from a gang he was in when he was 13 years old, before developing into "Bugzy Malone" when he was serving his prison sentence. After leaving prison, Davies began to take music seriously as a side hobby to his then-growing boxing career.

Career

2010–2015: Career beginnings 
Malone released his debut mixtape, SwaggaMan, in 2010. He began freestyling for northern grime YouTube channel KODH TV on their series Spray Out Freestyle. He then freestyled on popular urban YouTube channels including Grime Daily. In 2011, Davies released his second mixtape Why So Serious, inspired by Batman: The Dark Knight Rises. The lead single from the mixtape "Hip Hop Heavy Metal" was released on 21 September, 2011 and the music video currently has 1.3 million views on YouTube. Lost in Meanwhile City, Malone's third mixtape, was released in 2012. Malone commented on the mixtape on his website: I called this mixtape "Lost In Meanwhile City" because I stumbled across a film called Franklyn — I felt like I could relate to the dark atmosphere at the time and also some of the featured characters faced similar problems I felt I was faced with i.e family problems, girl problems, law suits, depression. I felt 'Lost In Meanwhile City' was the perfect metaphor for my position in life at that particular time, I felt lost and basically in a world of my own. The lead single for the project and the second music video created by Malone was released on 23 August 2012. In 2014, Malone announced his fourth mixtape, Journal of an Evil Genius, and begun a "mixtape campaign" where he released music videos with narratives that coincided with the singles released from the mixtape, similar to a "visual album". The visuals were released in the form of a YouTube video every Monday at 19:00 for six weeks. On the topic of creating a campaign consisting of videos to promote the mixtape, Malone listed Quentin Tarantino as an influence and said: "I felt as if I wanted to tell a story loosely based on reality and used the raw emotion of the songs as an excuse to create a mini-horror movie." As of 2017, the videos have over 5 million views combined on YouTube. The mixtape was released on 10 February, 2014. Talking about the mixtape, Davies wrote on his website. I called this mixtape 'The Journal of an Evil Genius' mainly because that is what it is. The songs themselves are written in a journal-like style making this record the one that means the most to me. The "Evil Genius" is an alias I came up with one day in the studio and it just kind of stuck. This project is an Intricate/accurate story about my past all the way back to childhood going right the way up to the present giving it a journal-like feel.

2015–present: Feud with Chip, Walk with Me, Facing Time and King of the North 
On 7 September 2014, Malone released a "Spitfire" freestyle on JDZmedia which procured his first million views on YouTube and gave him more popularity outside Manchester; it later earned him a performance on Fire in the Booth with Charlie Sloth on BBC Radio 1Xtra. Davies released his latest Fire in The Booth video on 14 March 2015. When Malone originally received a phone call from Sloth requesting an appearance on Radio 1Xtra's Fire in the Booth segment, he thought it was a prank call. Malone's Fire in the Booth is currently the most viewed video in the series with 25 million views. In May 2016, 1Xtra released Davies' second Fire in the Booth which currently has 9 million views. During his Fire in The Booth, Davies dissed fellow grime artist Chip. Chip, two days later, published a tweet on Twitter saying "The name you can ride off... CHIPMUNK!" before replying to his critics including Davies lyrically on the song "Pepper Riddim" which was released on 20 March, 2015. A grime feud and drew attention to the grime scene. Several days later on 25 March, Davies released "Relegation Riddim". The music video on YouTube featured many artists who were included in the feud, including Big Narstie. The video currently has over 12 million views, making it Davies' most viewed music video. On 3 April, 2017 Chip released "The End" which Davies replied to with "The Revival." In September 2017, Chip replied to "The Revival" with six tracks which led to Davies replying twice. This would be the last time Davies replied to Chip who later went on to include two more diss tracks before stopping. In July 2017, Davies released a documentary-style vlog in promotion for his EP King of the North where he directly references the feud, saying: He phoned me saying "Yo listen, we can do this thing like a, back and forth ting and shine some light on your career" but you know yourself, I've been grinding at this point for six years. I don't need anybody to shine. Right, so, it was a case of "alright, cool" and it was quite a civilized conversation. He was like "we can do festivals together" and this that and the other and I was like "yeah, I hear that bro, but I kind of already wrote my response."On 13 June 2015, DJ MistaJam premiered Malone's first official single "Watch Your Mouth" on BBC Radio 1 and the video was released on Malone's YouTube channel the same night. The track went on to be played across UK radio and popular TV networks, including Capital Xtra, Bang Radio, Kiss 100, Reprezent, Unity Radio, BBC Xtra, Radio 1, Asian Network, Westside FM, MTV Base, Flava TV, Kiss TV and Channel AKA. On 24 July, 2015, Malone released his first EP Walk with Me, which entered at number 8 on the UK Albums Chart. He later set up his own record label, "Ill Gotten Records", in an attempt to assist Manchester-based artists.

Malone released Facing Time, his second EP, which made No. 6 on the UK Albums Chart on 16 June 2016. To promote the EP, he released a trilogy of visuals titled "Section 8(1)" meant to coincide with the subject matter of the EP. On 27 August, released the first "chapter" with the same name as his hit song, "Beauty and the Beast". On 28 August, 2016, chapter 2 was released and was based on the song "Facing Time". On 29 August 2016, the third and final chapter, based on the song "I Suggest", was released. "Section 8(1)" was produced by G. Kuba and Malone himself. Malone planned a publicity stunt about himself being arrested in an armed robbery to promote the EP.

Malone released his first charting single "Through The Night" with DJ Luck & MC Neat on 18 May 2017. The song charted at No. 92, making it Davies' first charting single on the UK singles chart. Davies released his third EP King of the North on 14 July 2017. The album charted at No. 4 on the UK Album Charts and had three charting singles, "Through the Night", "Memory Lane" and "Bruce Wayne", charting at 92, 74 and 99 respectively. Davies was announced as one of the artists performing at the Manchester Evening News Arena reopening and posted on his personal Twitter account following his performance: "I've told them before and I'll tell them again Manchester is the home of the brave..."

A photo of Davies and Chip pictured together at Giggs' birthday party was uploaded to Instagram on 13 December 2017. This led to speculation that their two year long feud was either over or had been faked. Davies explained that he reconciled with Chip and ended their feud at the party.

Artistry

Musical style 
Malone lists his biggest inspiration as Tupac Shakur. The Guardian has called Malone a trendsetter for Manchester's urban music scene, mainly its grime scene where he was the first Manchester grime artist to reach national commercial success. When asked to describe his sound by MTV, he called his sound an "Evolution of Grime." Malone's Mancunian accent is a trademark of his vocal style which has been described as "deep-from-the-diaphragm".

Malone has been praised for his writing style which has been called "introspective", "confessional", and "unique". Davies' lyrics usually deal with criminality, poverty and emotional suffering. Malone's delivery has been called "clear, powerful and precise", and "fast-rapid" when he is rapping.

Fashion 
In May 2016, Malone partnered with Supply & Demand for a fashion line that would mainly encompass track suits. The line was sold at retail chain JD Sports and has dropped three sets of the Supply & Demand collaboration. Malone's clothing is mainly merchandise that had been formatted into high-end fashion wear. The clothing generally has traits of things that Davies likes, such as the superhero, Batman.

Legal issues 
When Davies was sixteen, he was arrested and sent to HMP Stoke Heath. 

On September 14 2020, Bugzy appeared in court after being charged with 2 counts of wounding to inflict grievous bodily harm. He was cleared of the charges after the jury accepted he was acting in self defence.

Personal life 
Davies proposed to his then-girlfriend of 9 years on 20 December 2019. He is believed to be having a child with her.

On 26 March 2020, Davies was seriously injured after being involved in a crash in Bury. Footage circulated on Twitter of the rapper riding a quad bike and was followed by videos of him lying on the ground in the aftermath of the collision. He was revealed to have crashed into a car at 70 mph whilst not wearing a helmet, which led to him subsequently suffering a brain bleed.

Discography

Studio albums

Extended plays

Mixtapes

Singles

As lead artist

As featured artist

Other charted and certified songs

Guest appearances

Filmography

Film

References

1990 births
Black British male rappers
English male rappers
Rappers from Manchester
Grime music artists
Living people